Nayib is a male given name, likely of Arabic origin. Notable people with the given name include:

Nayib Bukele (born 1981), Salvadoran politician and businessman who is the 43rd president of El Salvador
Nayib Lagouireh (born 1991), Belgian footballer

References